Adetomyrma is a genus of ants endemic to Madagascar. Workers of this genus are blind. The type species Adetomyrma venatrix was described in 1994, with the genus being an atypical member of its tribe, the Amblyoponini. This tribe includes the Dracula ants, members of which can feed on the hemolymph of larvae and pupae.

Taxonomy
Adetomyrma was first described as a Malagasy endemic monotypic genus by Ward in 1994. Ward (1994) assigned this genus to Amblyoponini within the subfamily Ponerinae on the basis of the worker morphology of the type species Adetomyrma venatrix. Later, Bolton (2003) raised this tribe to subfamily status as Amblyoponinae.

Biology
The colonies, the first of which was found in a rotting log, may contain as many as 10,000 workers, winged males and several wingless queens (the majority of ant species feature winged queens). The workers use venom to stun their prey which are brought back to the colony for the larvae to feed upon. The colour of the winged males, a darker orange than the workers, suggests they disperse by flying to other colonies before mating.

Known species
Adetomyrma aureocuprea Yoshimura & Fisher, 2012
Adetomyrma bressleri Yoshimura & Fisher, 2012
Adetomyrma caputleae Yoshimura & Fisher, 2012
Adetomyrma cassis Yoshimura & Fisher, 2012
Adetomyrma caudapinniger Yoshimura & Fisher, 2012
Adetomyrma cilium Yoshimura & Fisher, 2012
Adetomyrma clarivida Yoshimura & Fisher, 2012
Adetomyrma goblin Yoshimura & Fisher, 2012
Adetomyrma venatrix Ward, 1994

References

External links

Amblyoponinae
Ant genera
Blind animals
Hymenoptera of Africa
Endemic fauna of Madagascar